Les Mées ( or ; Occitan: Lei Mès) is a commune in the Alpes-de-Haute-Provence department in southeastern France.

Geography
The Bléone forms the commune's northern border, then flows into the Durance, which forms the commune's western border.

Population

See also
Communes of the Alpes-de-Haute-Provence department

References

Communes of Alpes-de-Haute-Provence
Alpes-de-Haute-Provence communes articles needing translation from French Wikipedia